Auchenflower  is an inner suburb of the City of Brisbane, Queensland, Australia. 

Torwood is a neighbourhood within Auchenflower.

Geography 

History

The area was formerly populated by rural estates, one of which was named Auchenflower by Thomas McIlwraith circa 1880. The name Auchenflower is a Gaelic word meaning field of flowers.

Between 1900 and 1962 Auchenflower was served by trams running along Milton Road from Toowong.  The services were withdrawn after the disastrous Paddington tram depot fire.

In May 1920, "Drysllwyn Estate" made up of 37 allotments was advertised to be auctioned by Cameron Bros, auctioneers. A map advertising the auction states that the Estate is opposite the residence "Drysllwyn" and near Auchenflower Railway Station.

In September 1921, "Chermside Park, second section" made up of 50 allotments was advertised to be auctioned by Cameron Bros, auctioneers. A map advertising the auction states that the estate is convenient to the Toowong tram line.

Auchenflower Infants' Provisional School opened on 30 January 1922. It closed in 1960.

St Alban the Martyr Anglican Church was dedicated by Archbishop Gerald Sharp on 18 November 1923. In 1954 the foundation stone for a new church building was laid by Archbishop Philip Strong. The church's deconsecration and closure in 2015 was approved by Local Bishop Godfrey Fryar. The site is being redeveloped for residential apartments.

In 1975, the first NightOwl convenience store was opened at 392 Milton Road.

From 1975 to 1986, Auchenflower was officially a neighbourhood with the suburb of Toowong, but obtained independent suburb status on 16 November 1986.

In January 2011, Auchenflower experienced flooding as part of the 2010–11 Queensland floods.

The median age of the Auchenflower population was 31 years of age, 7 years below the Australian median. 67.9% of people were born in Australia., compared to the national average of 66.7; the next most common countries of birth were England 3.2%, New Zealand 2.9%, India 2.2% and China 1.8%. 77.0% of people only spoke English at home. Other languages spoken at home included Mandarin at 2.1%. The most common responses for religion were No Religion 38.5% and Catholic 21.4%.

Heritage listings
Auchenflower has a number of heritage-listed sites, including:
 45 Cadell Street: Raymont Lodge
 451 Coronation Drive: Moorlands

Facilities 
The Wesley Hospital is a private hospital located near the Auchenflower train station.

Auchenflower Stadium (also known as NAB Stadium), previously known as The Auchendome, is a basketball centre in Auchenflower, Queensland.

Transport

By train, the Auchenflower railway station is the second station on the Ipswich line west of Roma Street railway station.

By bus, Auchenflower is served by most western suburb bus routes operated by Brisbane Transport.

By road, Auchenflower has two main roads through the suburb, Coronation Drive and Milton Road, both running from the Brisbane CBD towards the western suburbs. As of 2006 the "TransApex" traffic proposal touted by the former Lord Mayor, Campbell Newman, involves the construction of a major road tunnel system through Brisbane, including one to run under Toowong, Auchenflower and Milton, possibly along the alignment of Milton Road.

By bicycle, the Bicentennial Bikeway runs along the Brisbane River allowing access to the Brisbane CBD through to Toowong.

References

Sources

External links

 
 
 

 
Suburbs of the City of Brisbane